This is a list of characters on the animated television series The Mighty B!.



The Higgenbottoms

Bessie Higgenbottom
Bessie Kajolica Higgenbottom is a 9¾-year-old, geeky, bespectacled "Honeybee Scout" characterized by her extreme hyperactivity and unshakably dedicated work-ethic. Ambitious, infuriatingly-persistent, and highly sociable, Bessie is determined to earn every badge in existence on the firm belief that achieving this goal will transform her into a superhero known as the Mighty Bee (and it was implied in one episode involving a meeting between Bessie and the founder of the Honeybee Scouts that this theory actually may be true), showing obsessive devotion to the scouting troop and any mission that she establishes for herself in attaining her goal. Pure-hearted and friendly, Bessie is oblivious to other people's dislike of her, blind to the bratty Portia Gibbons's exclusion and belittling of her regardless of the severity of her insults. In spite of this factor, Bessie displays extreme precociousness and intellect, constructing both a robot and an atom smasher for the upcoming Honeybee Science Fair and showing the business and negotiation skills of someone twice her age. Nonetheless, she shows vulnerability to her weak eyesight, unicorns, cute animals, and stereotypically-feminine interests such as sparkles and glitter. Bessie also has a lisp; this can be noticed whenever she says a sentence that has the letter S. She is voiced by former SNL cast member Amy Poehler.

Happy Higgenbottom
Happy Walter Higgenbottom is Bessie's cherished pet dog adopted in the pilot episode as a scraggly stray hanging around near the community fisherman's wharf. Albeit Happy was originally reluctant to be so forcibly adopted and lived in resentment with his new owner, he gradually grew to further appreciate her, albeit he is depicted as something of a sly character with manipulative mannerisms. Although Happy is incapable of speech, he communicates through barking that can somehow be comprehended by fellow characters in the series, though the exact wording of Happy's conversations with other characters is not translated or understood by audiences. He is gifted with partial anthropomorphism, as he demonstrates capabilities of walking on two legs, driving, gambling, or interaction with human characters. It was revealed in one episode that Happy was somehow mysteriously separated from his biological mother at a young age and that Mother's Day formerly presented unhappy connotations for him, though after a dog named Rose claiming to be his mother was revealed as a deceptive impostor, he grew to appreciate his adoptive family with the Higgenbottoms further. Happy appears to have a shady background, as he was formerly trained by a secret agency as an undercover dog and was treasured as an agent, though later wound up leaving this past behind. It also has been revealed that he enjoys gambling in his spare time in a secret casino intended for canines. He is voiced by Dee Bradley Baker.

Benjamin "Ben" Higgenbottom
Benjamin "Ben" Higgenbottom, voiced by Andy Richter, is Bessie's 6-year-old younger brother. He hopes to be Bessie's sidekick when she becomes the Mighty B. He isn't quite there yet, so Bessie often refers to him as her "trial sidekick" or says that she'd "possibly consider him for sidekick candidacy". Ben had a fear of foods touching each other because Bessie used to mash his food together when Bessie was a toddler and Ben was a baby. In "Hen and Bappy", Ben and Happy switched bodies by eating the Hippie's magical taquitos by mistake. In the episode O, Brother What Are Thou, Ben was briefly known as Bessie's nemesis the Hurtful Hornet due to jealousy brought by Happy being Bessie's substitute training sidekick. He also has a teddy bear called Mr. Pants, which wears vintage orange plaid pants. Andy Richter, the voice of Ben, is also the voice of Mort on the Nick show The Penguins of Madagascar. Richter talked about The Mighty B!, quoting: "[...] another dream come true, to be able to do cartoon voices. And, also, to get to do cartoon voices for [Ben and Mort] two really funny, cool cartoons that my kids love and that I'm proud to have them love. It's pretty great."

Hilary Higgenbottom
Hilary Higgenbottom, voiced by Megan Cavanagh, is the single hippie mother of Bessie, Happy and Ben. She owns and operates a coffee shop called Hilary's Café. She can be bowled over by Bessie just as much as everyone else is, but tends to handle her role as a parent in a free-spirited way. She's always full of good karma and positive energy and lets Bessie and Ben's imaginations run wild; unless they make a mess in the house or put themselves in danger. She is absent in many episodes.

The Honeybees
The Honeybees are a troop of scouts founded by Miriam Breedlove.  The troop the series focuses on is #828 in San Francisco, California. Every spring, the Honeybee troop is assigned the task of selling taffy. The leader of the troop is Mary Frances Gibbons, Portia's mother. The scouts seem to be very widespread, as a girl named Sissy Sullivan is in a Honeybee troop in Boston, Massachusetts.

Penny Lefkowitz
Penny Lefkowitz, voiced by Dannah Feinglass, is Bessie's awkward, dull, obese best friend. Though Penny is friends with Bessie, she also sometimes assists Portia Gibbons and her friend Gwen in torturing Bessie, so she goes against Bessie sometimes. In the episode "Penny Hearts Joey" she befriends a robotic kangaroo named Joey from a Chuck E. Cheese's-parodying pizza restaurant/arcade called "Jumpin' Joey's" where Joey is the restaurant's mascot and spokesperson. Penny's low intelligence causes her to believe that Joey is alive, and it is revealed at the end of the episode that he does have some feelings and is aware of the activities Penny is doing with him. Penny can communicate with sea lions and has asthma, and she also seems to have a love for chickens, and this is shown through her being seen sleeping with a toy chicken at night and her father's nickname for her, which is "Chicken." Penny also loves Honeybee Scout taffy, which is what Honeybee Scouts sell in the spring, and she often eats more taffy than she sells.  She also eats glue and is afraid to walk across the streets by herself. In "We Got the Bee", Penny played triangle as a member of the Pretty Pretty Princesses. She fainted due to stage fright, so Bessie had to step in and play drums for them instead. In "An I See Bee", it is revealed that Penny is 10 years old, making her 6 months younger than her mean, snobby friend Portia. It is said she once went undercover so well she got elected president of Venezuela.

Portia Gibbons
Portia Gibbons, voiced by Grey DeLisle believes she should be waited on and treated like a celebrity. She often addresses Bessie as "Messie" or just Bessie. She exercises her sense of entitlement on people like Bessie, who she knows would never do anything mean-spirited in return. As a stereotypical preteen socialite, she is interested in makeup, clothes, and Rocky. She typically has Penny, when she isn't with Bessie, and right-hand woman Gwen at her side. Portia constantly belittles and attempts to humiliate Bessie, dragging Gwen and Penny into the schemes as well and often going out of her way to do so. Her schemes against Bessie vary from harmless such as attempting to ruin her chances of getting a badge, to downright evil, like luring Bessie into a tank of hungry piranhas when she misplaced her glasses. She also likes sushi and gelato, often seen going to gelato shops in her free time. It is revealed in "Dang, It Feels Good to be a Gamester" that she is very good at video games, hence facing off with a rival boys troop playing "Raspberry Shortcake Attack V". When Portia got laryngitis in "Woodward and Beesting", Bessie thought she was an alien for a short period of time due to strange behaviors she only exhibits in private, such as dancing weirdly to techno music, liking squishy stickers, having her meals blended in a blender and drank like a milkshake, and wearing an ugly green scarf to protect her neck. In "So Happy Together", Portia briefly went insane when she discovered that her pet chihuahua was actually a rat, hence the breed's nickname, "Rat". In "Ten Little Honeybees", Portia received a gold locket as a birthday present. But shortly after she put it on, the lights strangely shut off and the locket disappeared right from her neck. It was later found stuck on Bessie's back pocket. It is also revealed that Portia is 10 years old. She has a cousin named Chelsea, who is meaner and more stuck-up than Portia. She is the only character that Portia is afraid of, which got her to reveal her soft side when Bessie and Penny helped her. She was the lead singer of the Pretty Pretty Princesses in "We Got the Bee". The Pretty Pretty Princesses' only known song was "Running with the Rainbow Unicorn", being the first known song in the series, besides the title song. Another part of her soft side is revealed in this episode when Bessie helps her and Gwen. Grey DeLisle was praised for her performance as Portia by the Animation Insider, calling her "hilarious" and that Portia is "obviously meant to be an annoying character, but her posh, pure-blooded arrogance is as fun as it is absurd. Portia calls Bessie Higgenbottom "Messy Stinkinbottom".

Gwen Wu
Gwen Wu, voiced by Jessica DiCicco, Portia's best friend, is "totally tuned into hip hop and urban culture, music and fashion." She has a plan of dominating the music and fashion worlds, as soon as she can get out of babysitting her five younger brothers. Gwen is Portia's lieutenant, and does whatever she says. She's always equipped with a witty comeback, which usually entails calling Bessie a nerd or dork. Despite this, she has a much larger tolerance for Bessie than Portia does and is somewhat nicer to her when Portia isn't around. She has a head for business and very clever. She played the guitar as one of the Pretty Pretty Princesses.

Mrs. Gibbons
Mary Frances Gibbons, voiced by Sarah Thyre, is the Honeybee troop leader and Portia's mother. She forced Portia to join the Honeybees and considers the troop "a mother-daughter bonding activity". During troop meetings, she shows blatant favoritism towards Portia and gets frustrated with Bessie when her achievements, zest, and zeal outshine Portia's. She has a very low tolerance for Bessie's energy level, often getting very frustrated with her. It is revealed in "Something's Wrong with this Taffy" that Mary Frances has been eating two boxes of taffy every day for twenty years. In "The Apprentice", Mary Frances hires Bessie as an apprentice, in the idea that her Patty Faye sales numbers will boost, but in the end, Bessie just winds up to be a big fat pain in the neck. In "Ten Little Honeybees", she gave Portia a golden locket as a birthday present.

Millie Millerson
Millie Millerson, voiced by Grey DeLisle, is a Honeybee scout with a slow way of talking, and loves shiny or reflective objects, such as tinsel or confetti. She has a pet turtle named Chester Turtleton. Millie is hypoglycemic. She used to have braces throughout the show, but in the episode Children of the Unicorn, her braces were removed. in "O Brother, Where Art Thou" she framed Bessie for disgracing the Troop828 Recreation Centre, and it's revealed she is known only as "The Gasslie Graff", after a brawl with her she apologized to Bessie that she was sorry she framed Bessie and to her friend she admits it, also in "The League of Ordinary Gentlemen" she is one whom however along with Bessie and Penny taunt Ben and the boy's club, while in "Irritable Blowing Syndrome" Millie is mentioned to be like a psychologist and much to that she helped Bessie out while she became stressed with Blowing, Millie tends to be a nice girl and much will do anything to help Bessie out.

Miriam Breedlove
Miriam Breedlove, voiced by Niecy Nash, is the founder of the Honeybees. She once went to brunch with Bessie, after Bessie won a competition. Miriam also confronts Honeybee taffy makers in San Francisco when Bessie contacts Miriam, telling her that the taffy is not being made with real honey.

Mona
An elderly woman who was a former honeybee. She tried to win the Sock Hop Badge to steal away from Bessie, but Bessie decides to give her a chance to dance and gets the badge.

Tigerlily Roberts
Tigerlily Roberts is a young Honeybee Scout whom unlike all but with the exception's of Bessie, Penny, Portia, Gwen, and Millie, have no speaking roles, she has tiger lily color hair, her name was revealed in "O Brother What Art Thou" as Tigerlily is perhaps her real name after a color. In "Stuffed Happens", her name is revealed in a list of the Honeybee's names.

Nisa Reddy
Nisa Reddy is a young Indian Honeybee Scout, unlike Bessie, Penny, Portia, Gwen, and Millie, she has no speaking roles, but although barely could be seen talking in "Dang It Feels Good to Bee a Gamester" she would not be heard speaking that she talked, Nisa however is likely a nice Honeybee since she possibly originates from India and maybe her first name is Indian as well, throughout the show she is possibly good friends along with Tigerlily since sometimes seen often together. In "Stuffed Happens", her name is revealed in a list of the Honeybee's names.

Jean Tatum Parklands
Jean Parklands real name Tatum as revealed in "O Brother What Art Thou" is her real name but prefers Jean better than Tatum, is a British Honeybee Scout, she has puffed brunet hair and freckles on her cheeks, and often in the show is one whom is a girl whom seems to be tough, unlike all Honeybees but Bessie, Penny, Portia, Gwen, and Millie do not speak. In "Stuffed Happens", her name is revealed in a list of the Honeybee's names.

Other characters
Finger is Bessie's left-hand index finger and imaginary friend. First thing every morning, she draws a smiley face on him, and every night before bed, she washes off his "awake" face to put on his "asleep" face. Whenever Bessie needs some advice, she seeks Finger's perspective of the matter. Bessie often restates Finger's imaginary question for others to understand what he is saying. Finger may seem like a figment of Bessie's imagination, but sometimes, it seems as if he has a mind of his own. In one episode, he is said to have a French cousin (portrayed by Bessie's right-hand index finger) named Fingér
Rocky Rhodes, voiced by Kenan Thompson, is a skater who works part-time as a waiter at Hilary's Café. Rocky is in a rock band called The Integritones and loves The Ramones. His hair covers his eyes. Portia also has a crush on him in "We Got the Bee". Where he seems more interested in Bessie, which worsens Portia's hatred for her.
Anton St. Germain, voiced by Matt Besser, was the dog show judge in the first episode, but he has also been shown as the science fair judge and the head of city council. He is a good friend of Mary Frances'. Bessie usually gets his last name wrong.
Mr. Wu, voiced by Keone Young, is the owner of a Chinese restaurant. Despite being Gwen Wu's father, he is good friends with the Higgenbottom family, especially Bessie. He very sweetly humors Bessie in all of her crazy schemes and the Mighty Bee imagining.
Hippie, voiced by Matt Besser, is a nameless hippie who roams around town without a care in the world. When he's not painting murals or riding his unicycle, he operates a magic shop. At times when no other adult will understand Bessie and her friends, the Hippie will, and usually can help in some way. He and Happy seem to be on the same wavelength.
Chelsea Gibbons, voiced by Jessica Chaffin, is Portia's even more conceited, bratty, and snobby cousin. She is the only character that intimidates Portia. She used to be in the Dragonflies troop, but quit because she thought it was lame.
Donald, voiced by Kevin Michael Richardson, is a resident mailman. A well-to-do individual, but also very edgy when it comes to delivering mail to Bessie, who often frightens him.
Chai Gallagher, voiced by Grey DeLisle, is a cynical news anchorwoman, who turns up in several episodes reporting on assorted major events in San Francisco, such as reporting on the phenomena of Bessie's unfortunately cursed middle name, and reporting on the crowds waiting in line for the long-awaited Raspberry Shortcake Space Attack V video game.
Sissy Sullivan, voiced by Amy Poehler, is Bessie's pen pal from Boston, Massachusetts. She talks in a Boston accent and is similar to Bessie in behavior. Sissy makes Bessie extremely jealous because she is better than her at everything including surfing, speaking Chinese, and taffy selling.
Mr. Pants/Mr. Evil Pants is Ben's teddy bear named Mr. Pants. From Ben's perspective he is very persuasive and wants to go to Spain. Later in the series he some how turned evil along with Ben, and after launching a teddy bear attack all wearing evil pants, they take the pants off (expect for him) then chain him up and build a wall.
Ronnie, voiced by Grey DeLisle, is a young Beaver scout who is the best known of all. He is a fat, pudgy kid who leads the Beavers. He has appeared the most out of all the Beavers, but most times, as a background character. His finger, Digit, rivals Finger, Bessie's finger. He appeared in "Name Shame", "Hen and Bappy", "Dang it Feels Good to Be a Gamester", "Dragonflies" and "Finger Pickin' Bad".

Scout troops
The Beavers are a troop of blue-uniformed boys with massive overbites, beaver tails, and childish male chauvinism. The Beaver troop seem to be categorized as clumsy, non-athletic, and somewhat geeky. The Beavers won the Beeathalon, beating the exhausted Honeybees, to which they lost in a subsequent multi-player contest on the Raspberry Shortcake Space Attack V. The best known of all the Beavers is Ronnie. He's the fat, pudgy kid who leads the Beavers. Ronnie has appeared the most out of all the Beavers, but most times, as a background character. His finger, Digit, rivals Finger, Bessie's finger. The Beavers are among the scout troops to have fallen victim to the Dragonflies.
The Dragonflies are a troop hailing from Oakland, California. The troop, like the Honeybees, is made up of young girls, but the Dragonflies are much more mischievous and ill-mannered, also mentioned as the most fierce troop in the San Francisco Bay Area. According to Bessie, each Dragonfly scout is handpicked from birth and trained in 64 types of combat including long division, although this may be an exaggeration on Bessie's part. The Dragonflies act on their own accord, claiming other troops' territories as their own. The most notable Dragonfly is Cherry, voiced by Maya Rudolph, a petite, red-haired girl who acts as the leader of her group. Other notable Dragonflies are the hulking Maude, voiced by Grey DeLisle, the enthusiastic dark-skinned Bibi, voiced by Audrey Wasilewski, Laurie, a long-faced dark-skinned girl skilled at unscrambling Scrabble letters. (she doesn't talk or have a name she was Called Laurie by Fans On the Internet,) and a purple female dog, Cha-Cha, who seems to be very fond of Happy. Chelsea Gibbons was formerly a Dragonfly, but she quit because she thought it was lame.
The Black Widow Spiders are a troop that frequently meets at the abandoned, rusted warehouse of Pier 13. This troop appears to be hostile, as they attacked Bessie and her friends when they accidentally stumbled into the wrong pier. The girls who are in the Black Widow troop wear dark eyeshadow, purple shirts adorned with skull patterns, red and white striped stockings, frayed black skirts, and buckled shoes.  They are sensitive to light, which they avoid.
The Butterflies - A troop that hails from Berkeley, California. The Butterflies excel in wholesome activities such as picnics and maypoles. This troop's picnic was under siege by the Dragonflies as the Butterflies were swarmed and tied to their maypole, despite their protest, "No! We were having nice, clean fun!".
 The Gorillas - A boys troop from Southern Canada. Their uniforms are brown with reddish orange handkerchief. They are a very tough boys troop. According to Bessie, they are the most elite and ruthless boy troop in Southern Canada. Even though there are troops in America in this show, there are some that are in Canada. The leader of the Gorillas is Murdock who sells a Beef Jerky Energy Drink to Bessie since the Gorillas need money for a volcano trip. Murdock convinces Ben to be a Gorilla. But Bessie disguises as Ben since Ben is too scared to be a gorilla. Bessie, disguised as Ben does very successful with the Gorillas.

References

Mighty B!
Fictional characters from San Francisco
Characters